Vitaly Mikhailovich Parkhimovich (17 June 1943 – 15 January 1995) was a Soviet rifle shooter. He competed at the 1968 and 1972 Summer Olympics, and won a bronze medal in the three positions event in 1968.

Parkhimovich was born in Russia in a family of a career military officer. In 1948 he moved to Belarus where he lived most of his life. During his career he won nine gold and seven silver medals in various rifle events at the world championships. He also won 13 European titles, seven times placing second.

References

1943 births
1995 deaths
Soviet male sport shooters
Olympic shooters of the Soviet Union
Shooters at the 1968 Summer Olympics
Shooters at the 1972 Summer Olympics
Olympic bronze medalists for the Soviet Union
Olympic medalists in shooting
Medalists at the 1968 Summer Olympics
Sportspeople from Ryazan